The Canon EOS 500 (EOS Kiss in Japan, EOS Rebel XS in North America) is a consumer-level 135 film single-lens reflex camera, produced by Canon of Japan from September 1993 until 1996 as part of their EOS system. It replaced the earlier EOS 1000FN and sat in the lower portion of the EOS range, it was superseded by the EOS 500N.

References

External links
 

500